Mai Yamaguchi (山口 舞 Yamaguchi Mai, born July 3, 1983) is a former Japanese volleyball player who played for Okayama Seagulls.  She was part of Japan's 2012 bronze medal-winning team.

Mai participated in the 2018 FIVB Volleyball Women's World Championship, which was her last international tournament with the national team. She announced retiredment from volleyball player in 2019.

Profile
Her nickname is "Yume", which means "dream" in Japanese. Another nickname is Pearl, which is locally farmed specialty of her hometown of Shima, in Mie prefecture. She liked knitting and cooking at the time of her bronze medal and she also enjoyed figure skating.

Clubs
  Osaka International Takii High School
  Okayama Seagulls (2002-2019)

National team
  National team (2009-2018)

Awards

Individual
 2011–12 V.Premier League - Best 6
 2013–14 V.Premier League - Best6

Team
2005 Kurowashiki All Japan Volleyball Tournament -  Runner-Up, with Okayama Seagulls
2002–06,08–11 Domestic Sports Festival (Volleyball) -  Champion, with Okayama Seagulls
 2012–13 V.Premier League -  Bronze Medal with Okayama Seagulls
 2013 Empress's Cup -  Runner-up with Okayama Seagulls
 2013–14 V.Premier League -  Runner-up with Okayama Seagulls

National team
2010 World Championship -  Bronze medal
2011 Asian Championship -  Silver medal
2012 Olympics -  Bronze medal
2014 FIVB World Grand Prix -  Silver medal

References

External links
 FIVB Biography

Japanese women's volleyball players
Okayama Seagulls players
Living people
1983 births
Olympic volleyball players of Japan
Volleyball players at the 2012 Summer Olympics
Volleyball players at the 2016 Summer Olympics
Olympic bronze medalists for Japan
Olympic medalists in volleyball
Medalists at the 2012 Summer Olympics
Japan women's international volleyball players